Sinobad was a Serb family of Kninska Krajina ("Knin Krajina"), part of the so-called "Morlachs", a community in the Dalmatian hinterland that fought for the Republic of Venice against the Ottoman Empire.

Members 
Petar Sinobad (fl. 1654–d. 1684), hajduk
Mitar Sinobad (fl. 1654–d. 1684), Venetian soldier
Filip Sinobad (fl. 1691–d. 1694), hajduk barjaktar and serdar of Kninska Krajina (1691–94)
Jovan Sinobad (fl. 1691–d. 1715), Venetian knight (cavalieri di San Marco, 1696)

Descendants 
Siniša Sinobad, Yugoslav pilot

See also
Morlachs
Morlachs (Venetian irregulars)
Vuk Mandušić (fl. 1648), military commander in Venetian service
Stojan Janković (1636–1687), Morlach leader
Stanislav Sočivica, Venetian rebel
Cvijan Šarić
Petronije Selaković
Bajo Pivljanin
Grujica Žeravica
Vukosav Puhalović
Ilija Smiljanić
Petar Smiljanić
Vuk Močivuna
Juraj Vranić
Tadije Vranić

Serb families
Croatian families
Republic of Venice families
Serbs of Croatia
17th-century Serbian people
Venetian period in the history of Croatia
History of Dalmatia
Serbian surnames